Terence John "Terry" Robbins (born 14 January 1965) is an English former professional footballer who played in the Football League as a forward.

References

Sources
 

1965 births
Living people
Footballers from Southwark
English footballers
England semi-pro international footballers
Association football forwards
Gillingham F.C. players
Maidstone United F.C. (1897) players
Crawley Town F.C. players
Welling United F.C. players
Barnet F.C. players
Bishop's Stortford F.C. players
Boreham Wood F.C. players
Enfield F.C. players
English Football League players